The National Aquarium – also known as National Aquarium in Baltimore and formerly known as Baltimore Aquarium – is a non-profit public aquarium located at 501 East Pratt Street on Pier 3 in the Inner Harbor area of downtown Baltimore, Maryland in the United States. Constructed during a period of urban renewal in Baltimore, the aquarium opened on August 8, 1981. The aquarium has an annual attendance of 1.5 million visitors and is the largest tourism attraction in the State of Maryland. The National Aquarium's mission is to inspire conservation of the world's aquatic treasures. The aquarium's stated vision is to confront pressing issues facing global aquatic habitats through pioneering science, conservation, and educational programming.

The National Aquarium houses several exhibits including the Upland Tropical Rain Forest, a multiple-story Atlantic Coral Reef, an open-ocean shark tank, and Australia: Wild Extremes, which won the "Best Exhibit" award from the Association of Zoos and Aquariums in 2008. The aquarium also has a "4D Immersion Theater." The aquarium opened a marine mammal pavilion on the adjacent south end of Pier 4 in 1990, and currently holds six Atlantic bottlenose dolphins. Of the six, five were born at the National Aquarium, one was born at another American aquarium.

In 2003, the National Aquarium and the much older and independent National Aquarium in Washington, D.C., formed an alliance to operate as a single National Aquarium with two sites. This arrangement continued until 2013, when the Washington location closed permanently.

Recognition and awards
In 2012, the National Aquarium was named one of the best aquariums in the United States by the Travel Channel and also received the popular vote as one of the top five best aquariums to visit by the website 10best.com. Coastal Living magazine named the National Aquarium the #1 aquarium in the United States in 2009. In November 2006, the National Aquarium won a Best of Baltimore award from the Baltimore City Paper as the "Best Over Priced Destination for Families." In September 2011, the City Paper Reader's Poll awarded the National Aquarium with the title of "Best Attraction" and the "Best Place to Take Kids".

History
The aquarium began in the mid-1970s when then-Mayor William Donald Schaefer, (1921-2011), and the Commissioner of the city Department of Housing and Community Development, Robert C. Embry, inspired by a visit to the two-decade old New England Aquarium on the waterfront of Boston, Massachusetts, conceived and championed the idea of an aquarium as a vital component of Baltimore's overall downtown and Inner Harbor redevelopment scheme. In 1976, Baltimore City residents supported the idea of an aquarium by voting for it on a bond loan referendum, and the groundbreaking for the facility took place on old Pier 3 facing East Pratt Street, just east of the newly completed World Trade Center in the city's Inner Harbor on August 8, 1978.

Although no federal funds were used for its construction, the United States Congress later designated the facility as the "national aquarium" in 1979. The aquarium opened to the public on August 8, 1981, after three years of construction, and one year after the booming "festival marketplace" of the two Harborplace shopping pavilions further west conceived by nationally famous, local developer James Rouse.

The National Aquarium, Baltimore's initial conceptual design, architecture and exhibit design was led by Peter Chermayeff of Peter Chermayeff LLC while he was at Cambridge Seven Associates.

The conceptual, architectural, and exhibit design for the Glass Pavilion expansion was led by Bobby C. Poole while at Chermayeff, Sollogub & Poole. After two decades, construction began on the Glass Pavilion north extension on September 5, 2002, and it opened to the public on December 16, 2005.

Conservation, research, and green practices

The National Aquarium was selected as the National Wildlife Federation's Maryland affiliate in 2011. The aquarium conducts conservation efforts through events to clean up the Chesapeake Bay Wetlands, and the aquarium's Marine Animal Rescue Program (MARP), which rescues, rehabilitates, and releases marine mammals. MARP has successfully rescued, treated, and returned seals, dolphins, porpoises, pilot whales, pygmy sperm whales, sea turtles, and a manatee to their natural habitats.

The National Aquarium Conservation Center (est. 2009) leads the aquarium's research efforts in resolving critical issues currently impacting coastal ecosystems and watersheds, ocean health, ecological aquaculture, and informs issues of environmental policy and advocacy through conservation research focused on aquatic ecosystems. Some of the Center's projects include "The Chesapeake Bay Initiative", tracking mercury levels through the food chain in wild and captive bottlenose dolphins, and assessing chronic natural resource damages from the BP oil spill in the Gulf of Mexico.

In 2011, The National Aquarium was honored with the Maryland Green Registry Leadership Award, as an organization that shows “a strong commitment to sustainable practices, measurable results, and continuous improvement”  and was recognized by the Baltimore Business Journal and Smart CEO Magazine for exceptional green business practices in 2009.

A 4.3 MW solar farm in Cambridge supplies about 40% of the power for the National Aquarium, and saves about 1,300 metric tons of carbon dioxide during the summer. Energy efficiency upgrades in 2015 saved an additional 3,200 tons of CO2 over the summer.

Exhibits

Pier 3 Pavilion
This building contains five levels or floors that are accessible via escalator and elevator except to guests with strollers. Guests with toddlers must carry them on their person. Each floor possesses several exhibits that communicate a main theme.  This building also houses two large tanks, one of which simulates an Atlantic coral reef, and one of which simulates the open ocean.

Level 1: Blacktip Reef

Originally, it was a marine mammal exhibit that had bottlenose dolphins from the Gulf of Mexico and beluga whales, but when Pier 4 opened, the animals were moved there. Subsequently, that area became an exhibit called Wings in the Water – which included several species of stingray and Calypso the Sea turtle until 2013, when it became Blacktip Reef. This  habitat, replicating an Indo-Pacific reef landscape (living corals are exhibited elsewhere in the National Aquarium), can be seen from many vantage points, including a new floor-to-ceiling pop-out viewing window. It contains 69 species of fish including blacktip reef sharks, emperor angelfish, harlequin tuskfish, humphead wrasse, reticulate whipray, blotched fantail ray, spotted unicornfish, tasselled wobbegong and zebra shark. One of the largest animals in the exhibit was Calypso, a 500-pound green sea turtle that was rescued off the shore of Long Island in 2000. Her left front flipper had become infected and required amputation in order to save her life. Calypso was introduced into Blacktip Reef in July 2013, and died in February 2020.

Level 2: Maryland: Mountains to the Sea
This level features animals that are native to Maryland.  The four exhibits create the illusion that the viewer is traveling down a Maryland stream from its source in the Allegheny Mountains, to a tidal marsh, to a coastal beach, and finally ending at the Atlantic shelf. Featured animals include wood turtle, American bullfrog, and rosyside dace in the Allegheny Stream, diamondback terrapin, striped blenny, and sheepshead minnow in the Tidal Marsh, striped burrfish and lookdown in the Coastal Beach, and clearnose skate and summer flounder in the Atlantic Shelf exhibit.

Level 3: Surviving Through Adaptation, Living Seashore
This level features fish that possess adaptations that are needed to survive in their various environments.  For example, the electric eel has the rare ability to shock its prey with electricity and the peacock mantis shrimp uses its strong claws to punch its predators. Featured animals include electric eel, lined seahorse, longnose gar, peacock mantis shrimp and Spotfin butterflyfish.

Living Seashore is a  exhibit on the atlantic seashore featuring two touchpools and a variety of hands-on experiences, giving guests the opportunity to explore the ever-changing Mid-Atlantic shoreline. Animals guests can interact with include little skate, Atlantic stingray, Atlantic horseshoe crab, knobbed whelk, and moon jelly.

Level 4: North Atlantic to the Pacific, Amazon River Forest
This level displays several aquatic habitats, including a sea cliffs exhibit, which houses seabirds like Atlantic puffins and black guillemots; a Pacific coral reef exhibit housing Bangaii cardinalfish, percula clownfish and yellow tangs; a kelp forest exhibit with garibaldis, horn shark and several types of starfish; and an Amazon River forest exhibit, in which animals can be seen down in the water and up in the overlying foliage. Animals housed in the Amazon River Forest include reptiles like Arrau turtles, emerald tree boas, smooth-fronted caimans, amphibians such as the giant waxy monkey frog and several types of fish like the blue discus, silver arowana and white-blotched river stingray.

Level 5: Upland Tropical Rain Forest, Hidden Life
This level simulates the Amazon rainforest, and includes two elevated platforms for bird-watching and a cave of various glass-enclosed displays of reptiles, amphibians, and terrestrial arthropods. 
Featured animals include:
Golden lion tamarin 
Scarlet ibis 
Sunbittern 
Yellow-headed amazon parrot 
Blue-crowned motmot 
Turquoise tanager
Blue poison dart frog 
Yellow-footed tortoise
Linnaeus's two-toed sloth

Atlantic Coral Reef
This large  exhibit replicates the Atlantic coral reef, and is filled with more than 100 exotic species that would be found anywhere from closer to shore to out into the trench and open ocean, including a green moray eel, queen triggerfish, black grouper, blacknose shark, Atlantic tarpon, spotfin butterflyfish and spot-fin porcupinefish.

The exhibit will also soon contain a Kemp's Ridley Sea Turtle

Shark Alley: Atlantic Predators
This large, ring shaped exhibit originally called open ocean replicates the deeper portions of the Atlantic coral reef, and is filled with larger reef animals such as roughtail stingray, sandbar shark, sand tiger shark, nurse shark, crevalle jack and largetooth sawfish. This exhibit formerly held lemon sharks and a tiger shark.

Pier 4 Pavilion
This smaller building, opened in December 1990, features the marine mammal exhibit, which is home to Atlantic bottlenose dolphins in a  facility. It also holds a temporary exhibit on assorted jellyfish called "Jellies Invasion: Oceans Out of Balance".

Dolphin Discovery
This exhibit currently houses the aquarium's six bottlenose dolphins. Guests can watch training, feeding, and play times with the dolphins and interact with dolphin experts.

The dolphin colony consists of two males (Foster, Beau) and four females (Spirit, Chesapeake, Bayley, Jade), the youngest being Bayley, 2008. Chesapeake was the first dolphin born at the aquarium in 1992.

These will be the last dolphins housed at the Aquarium. In June 2016, the National Aquarium announced plans to construct a sanctuary in Florida or the Caribbean for its colony of bottlenose dolphins. The new sanctuary will be roughly between 50 to 100 times the size of the current dolphin exhibit. "The sanctuary would be the first of its kind in North America and will provide the dolphins with a protected, seaside habitat, creating a new option for how dolphins can thrive in human care,” according to the Aquarium's website. The Aquarium aims to move the dolphins to this sanctuary by 2023.

Jellies Invasion: Oceans Out of Balance
Opened in 2009, this temporary exhibit in the Pier 4 Pavilion building showcases nine different species of jellyfish, and also illustrates how these animals are important bioindicators, which means that they are sensitive to changes within their environment, and therefore, serve as an early warning sign that changes are occurring within an ecosystem, whether from pollution, invasive species, climate change, or other factors.

Featured animals Include:
Atlantic sea nettle
Bay nettle
Flower hat jelly
Pacific sea nettle
Purple-striped jelly  
Lion's mane jellyfish 
Blue blubber jellyfish
Upside-down jellyfish

Proposed master plan
In 2016, architect Jeanne Gang made a proposal to the National Aquarium to transform Pier 4 into a Chesapeake Bay themed exhibit to replace the Jellyfish and Dolphin exhibits. Even though details are sparse about this potential initiative, the new exhibits would include a waterfall, watershed, Lily pond, salt marsh, freshwater tidal, river and an open bay exhibit.

Australia: Wild Extremes (Glass Pavilion)
Like the Upland Tropical Rain Forest exhibit, this exhibit is structured like a large walk-in aviary, and allows many of the flying animals to roam freely throughout the exhibit. The exhibit represents a river gorge in Australia, and contains many pools in which Australian aquatic life can be found.  It is designed to show the wild extremes faced by this particular part of Australia: fire, drought and flood. Guests can see more than 1,800 individual native animals including freshwater crocodiles, turtles, free-flying birds, snakes, lizards, and flying foxes.

The exterior of the expansion features an interactive area designed to teach visitors about bayscaping, bird-box building, the National Aquarium's nationally recognized Marine Animal Rescue Program, water quality testing, marine debris issues and wetland restoration.

Inside the expanded portion of the Aquarium, directly in the main entrance, is a  waterfall that was modeled from an actual waterfall in a Maryland state park. The prominent display is also visible from outside the Aquarium. Also inside the expanded portion is a recreation of an Australian habitat. The Umbrawarra Gorge of Australia is carefully depicted inside the upper portion of the expanded building, and the exhibit depicts lands of fire, drought, and flood. Aboriginal artwork, based on actual work discovered in Australia, is also found in the gorge exhibit. These images depict aboriginal interpretations of the land that they live on.

Featured animals include:
Laughing kookaburra
Rainbow lorikeet
Broad-shelled river turtle 
Irwin's turtle
Kimberley long-necked turtle
Pig-nosed turtle
Northern death adder 
Spiny-tailed monitor 
Freshwater crocodile
Australian lungfish 
Mouth almighty
Common archerfish
Barramundi

Relationship with the National Aquarium, Washington, D.C.
The National Aquarium in Washington, D.C., was a separate aquarium housed in the lower level of the United States Department of Commerce Building, renamed the Herbert C. Hoover Building in 1981. On September 4, 2003, the National Aquarium Society and the Board of Governors for the National Aquarium in Baltimore announced an alliance, in which the National Aquarium in Baltimore would operate the Washington, D.C., aquarium as well. The two aquariums became a single organizational entity known as the National Aquarium with two venues. A signing ceremony formally recognizing the alliance hosted by United States Secretary of Commerce Donald Evans took place at the Herbert C. Hoover Building. However, after only ten years of joint operations, the National Aquarium in Washington permananently closed its doors on September 30, 2013, after 128 years in operation – the first time it had closed since its opening in 1885 – to make room for physical renovations of Herbert C. Hoover Building. Approximately 1,700 animals from the Washington location's collection were moved north to the National Aquarium in Baltimore.

Funding and staffing
The National Aquarium is a public, nonprofit aquarium. The aquarium building and the land upon which it is built are owned by the City of Baltimore, but the aquarium is managed by the non-profit National Aquarium, Inc. which consists of a volunteer 25-member Board of Governors and larger Advisory Board, plus a full-time paid staff. The National Aquarium is run by CEO John Racanelli, who came into the position on June 20, 2011.

Under the terms of its management agreement with the City, the non-profit corporation strives to remain self-supporting for operations. Details regarding funding, staffing, and programming are made available to the public within each year's annual report downloadable on the National Aquarium Institute's website.

References

External links

 
 The National Aquarium  Documentary produced by WETA-TV

Inner Harbor, Baltimore
Zoos in Maryland
Aquaria in Maryland
Landmarks in Baltimore
Tourist attractions in Baltimore
Buildings and structures in Baltimore
Museums established in 1981
1981 establishments in Maryland
Aquarium